Oswestry Town Football Club was a football club from Shropshire, playing at Victoria Road. They joined the Birmingham League in 1924 and switched to the Cheshire County League in 1959. In 1975 they made the move to the Southern League before transferring to the Northern Premier League in 1979.

The club folded in 1988, but reformed in 1993 playing in the Welsh National League (Wrexham Area). They played in the League of Wales from 2000 to 2003, at Park Hall, and in 2003 merged with Total Network Solutions F.C. (formerly Llansantffraid F.C.). In 2006 the merged club was renamed as The New Saints.

Managers

Source:

Tom Vaughan (?–1949) (Secretary Manager)
Tommy Gardner (1949–1951)#
George Rowlands Antonio (1951–1954)#
Alan Ball Sr. (1954–1957?)#
Keith Thomas (1957–1959?)
George Rowlands Antonio (1959–1961)
Dick Jones (1964?–1966)
Norman Hobson (1966–1967)#
Jackie Mudie (1967–?)
Johnny Morris (1967?–1969)
Fred Morris (1969–1973)
Len Kilby (1973–1975)
Dick Jones (1975)
Dave Pountney (1975–1976)
Alan Boswell (1976–1977)
||
Idris Pryce (1977–1978)
Freddie Hill (1978–1980)
Arthur Rowley (1980)
Fred Morris (1980–1983)
Ken Roberts (1983–1984)
Stuart Mason (1984–1985?)
Trevor Storton (1985?–1986)
John Rogers (1987–?)
Brynley Jones (1987–1988)
Ken Swinerton (1993–1996)
Mario Iquinta (1996–1997)
Ken Swinerton (1997–1999)
Steve O'Shaughnessy (1999–2001)
David Norman (2001–03)

# – Player-Manager

References

2003 disestablishments in England
Association football clubs disestablished in 2003
Defunct football clubs in Shropshire
Oswestry
Northern Premier League clubs
Southern Football League clubs
Welsh National League (Wrexham Area) Premier Division clubs
Cymru Premier clubs
Welsh National League (North) clubs
Cheshire County League clubs

no:The New Saints FC#Oswestry Town FC